The Borough of Wokingham is a local government district in Berkshire, United Kingdom. It is named after its main town, Wokingham. Other places in the district include Arborfield, Barkham, Charvil, Earley, Finchampstead, Hurst, Sonning, Remenham, Ruscombe, Shinfield, Twyford, Wargrave, Three Mile Cross, Winnersh, Spencers Wood and Woodley. The population of Wokingham is 177,500 according to 2021 census.

History
The district was formed on 1 April 1974 as Wokingham District, under the Local Government Act 1972, by the merger of the Municipal Borough of Wokingham and Wokingham Rural District. It is governed by Wokingham Borough Council (formerly Wokingham District Council), which has been a unitary authority since 1 April 1998, following the abolition of Berkshire County Council under the Banham Review. The district was granted borough status in 2007, following a petition to the Queen.

Government
The local authority is Wokingham Borough Council. It is a unitary authority, being a district council (but designated a borough council) also exercising the functions of a county council.

Education

State-funded schools in the Borough of Wokingham include nine secondary schools, two special schools and numerous primary schools. There are also a number of private schools.

Bracknell and Wokingham College is the main further and adult education provider for the borough, just outside the borough its headquarters is in Bracknell. The Borough's closest higher education provider is the main Whiteknights Park campus of the University of Reading immediately north-west, most of which in fact falls within the Wokingham Borough boundary.

Geography
Elevations range between 30 and 70 metres above sea level except higher in about 5% of the borough. The highest is an escarpment containing parts of the rural and wooded northern area, the hinterland of three Thames-side villages, facing the 30-mile long Chilterns AONB, west and north. A geological part of that range of hills, Bowsey Hill reaches 137m, in Wargrave civil parish,  from the river.

Approximately a right-angled triangle, the borough is long north to south.  It uses as its longest edge the course of the Loddon and Thames along its north-west, with a similarly salient-containing eastern boundary and an almost straight southern boundary.  Clockwise the boundaries are approximately 10, 8 and 5 miles on a direct path from point to point.  The southern boundary is approximately the Roman road from London to Bath through a highly coniferous Swinley Forest which sits in geology on the naturally acidic, Bagshot Formation.

The town in the district is Wokingham.  The villages are Arborfield, Barkham, Charvil, Earley, Finchampstead, Hurst, Sonning, Remenham, Ruscombe, Shinfield, Twyford, Wargrave, Three Mile Cross, Winnersh, Spencers Wood and Woodley.  Two villages have a wide range of small retail and visitor facilities: Wargrave and Twyford.  In major employment areas of trading and manufacturing Winnersh and Finchampstead are prominent. The village of Crowthorne is shared between Wokingham and the neighbouring borough of Bracknell Forest.

Home ownership
The borough has the highest proportion of home ownership of the six local authorities in Berkshire: combining the social (housing association and local authority provided) and private (private landlord) rented sectors, Slough's returns recorded in 2011 that its rented sector comprised 46% of its housing, whereas 18% of Wokingham's residents rented their homes.

Excluding lower-tier districts, Central Government has classified Wokingham as the least needy Local Authority.  Government funding is about £120 per head per year. This is the lowest among the combined category of county councils and unitary authorities, the basis on which it is overall assessed, and compares with over £1000 per head in others such as the London Borough of Hackney.

Freedom of the Borough
The following people and military units have received the Freedom of the Borough of Wokingham.

Individuals
 Alderman Stanley Leonard Bowyer: 30 January 1973.
 Mr. Leonard Goddard Smalley: 30 January 1973.

Military Units
 The Royal Electrical and Mechanical Engineers: 21 October 1978.

References

 
Unitary authority districts of England
Districts of Berkshire
Local authorities adjoining the River Thames
Boroughs in England